Our Ladies is a 2019 Scottish coming-of-age comedy-drama film produced and directed by Michael Caton-Jones, who co-wrote the screenplay with Alan Sharp, based on Alan Warner's 1998 novel The Sopranos. The film stars Tallulah Greive, Abigail Lawrie, Rona Morison, Sally Messham, Marli Siu, and Eve Austin.

Our Ladies premiered at the 2019 BFI London Film Festival. Its original theatrical release date of 6 March 2020 was delayed multiple times due to the COVID-19 pandemic, before finally being released in the United Kingdom on 27 August 2021.

Premise
In 1996, five best friends attend a strict Catholic school for girls in the Scottish Highlands town of Fort William. They get the opportunity to go into Edinburgh for a choir competition, but they are more interested in drinking, partying and hooking up than winning the competition. The group includes Orla, who is in recovery from leukemia and has an attitude of living life to the fullest; Finnoula, a brainy girl who is desperate to experience life beyond her small town; Chell, a wild child struggling with the loss of her father; Manda, a sharp-tongued, witty girl; and Kylah, a musical protégé with a rebellious spirit.

Cast

Production

Development
Michael Caton-Jones optioned Alan Warner's novel The Sopranos in 1998. It was announced in 2018 that production on a film adaptation had begun. Caton-Jones directed the film and wrote the screenplay with Alan Sharp. The film was produced by Sigma Films, Sony Pictures International Productions, and Four Point Play Pictures in association with Screen Scotland. Warner himself and Jennifer Armitage of Creative Scotland executive produced and Caton-Jones produced alongside Laura Viederman of Four Point Play and Brian Coffey of Sigma. Luke Scrase oversaw the film for SPIP.

Filming
Principal photography took place on location in Fort William and Edinburgh. Some scenes were also filmed in Glasgow.

Release
The world premiere of Our Ladies was held at the 2019 BFI London Film Festival on 4 October. It was also shown at the 2020 Glasgow Film Festival on 28 February. A trailer was released in January 2020. The film was initially set for theatrical release in the UK on 6 March 2020, which was then delayed to 24 April and subsequently 11 September due to the COVID-19 pandemic, before being shelved indefinitely. It was released at select AMC Theatres in the United States on 18 June 2021, and in cinemas in the UK on 27 August.

Reception
The film received critical acclaim. The consensus states: "Despite its outdated ideas about teen sexuality, Our Ladies presents a well-acted and affectingly nuanced portrait of female friendship."

Amal Abdi of the Evening Standard wrote, "One of the best features of Our Ladies is the distastefulness of its characters. This posse of unruly young women are brash, bullies and often magnificently cruel. Yet it is precisely these reasons that make the film more radical than offensive. By playing into the stereotypes, Our Ladies rejects the established portrayals which turn ordinary school girls into bad asses or inexplicable geniuses in the name of a 'strong female character.'" Abdi commented further, "Our Ladies has its flaws. The tone is uneven, it is overly eager and there are points when it is unrealistic to the point of absurdity. Nevertheless, it deserves to be seen. It speaks to the thinly veiled level that has long governed the treatment of young women."

Sophie Butcher of The Film Magazine said, "there’s a raucous energy and seemingly specifically Scottish nostalgia evident in Our Ladies that really set it apart", and concluded "Our Ladies is a wildly entertaining riot of a movie."

References

External links
 

2019 films
English-language Scottish films
2019 comedy-drama films
2010s coming-of-age comedy-drama films
British coming-of-age comedy-drama films
Films about Catholicism
Films based on British novels
Films directed by Michael Caton-Jones
Films postponed due to the COVID-19 pandemic
Films set in 1996
Films set in Scotland
Films shot in Edinburgh
Films shot in Highland (council area)
Films shot in Glasgow
Scottish films
British female buddy films
2010s female buddy films
2010s English-language films
2010s British films